Rissoina krebsii is a species of minute sea snail, a marine gastropod mollusk or micromollusk in the family Rissoinidae.

Distribution
This species occurs in the Gulf of Mexico off Cuba.

Description 
The maximum recorded shell length is 4.5 mm.

Habitat 
Minimum recorded depth is 0 m. Maximum recorded depth is 45 m.

References

 Mörch O.A.L. (1876). Synopsis molluscorum marinorum Indiarum occidentalium imprimis insularum danicarum. Malakozoologische Blätter, 23: 45-58, 87-143
  Rosenberg, G., F. Moretzsohn, and E. F. García. 2009. Gastropoda (Mollusca) of the Gulf of Mexico, Pp. 579–699 in Felder, D.L. and D.K. Camp (eds.), Gulf of Mexico–Origins, Waters, and Biota. Biodiversity. Texas A&M Press, College Station, Texas.

Rissoinidae
Gastropods described in 1876